Jim Anderson (born March 17, 1943) is an American politician who served as a member of the Wyoming Senate from the 2nd district, which includes Converse County and Platte County.

Early life and education
Jim Anderson was born on March 17, 1943, in Douglas, Wyoming. He graduated from Chadron State College in Chadron, Nebraska, and did some postgraduate work at the University of Wyoming.

Career 
He served as a member of the Wyoming House of Representatives from 1997 to 2000. From 2001 until his resignation on March 3, 2015, he served as a member of the Wyoming Senate. He served as President of the Wyoming Senate. He has stated that education is "the biggest social issue." He is opposed to gambling. In 2010, he sponsored a bill of 'cowboy ethics' after reading James Owen's book, Code of the West, about applying these principles to business.

He is a member of the Rotary International, the Glenrock Chamber of Commerce, the National Rifle Association, Moose International. He serves on the Board of Directors of the Mining Associates of Wyoming. He is also a member of the Executive Committee of the Council of State Governments.

Personal life 
He lived in Glenrock, Wyoming. He is married with two children and four grandchildren. He is a Protestant.

References

1943 births
People from Douglas, Wyoming
Living people
Chadron State College alumni
University of Wyoming alumni
Presidents of the Wyoming Senate
Republican Party Wyoming state senators
Republican Party members of the Wyoming House of Representatives
People from Glenrock, Wyoming